Vilém Tvrzský (1880 – 1943) was a fencer. He competed for Bohemia at the 1908 and 1912 Summer Olympics and for Czechoslovakia at the 1920 Summer Olympics.

References

1880 births
1943 deaths
Czech male fencers
Olympic fencers of Bohemia
Olympic fencers of Czechoslovakia
Fencers at the 1908 Summer Olympics
Fencers at the 1912 Summer Olympics
Fencers at the 1920 Summer Olympics